Kevin Mandolese (born August 22, 2000) is a Canadian professional ice hockey goaltender who is currently playing for the Belleville Senators in the American Hockey League (AHL) as a prospect to the Ottawa Senators of the National Hockey League (NHL). Mandolese was drafted in the sixth round, 157th overall, by the Senators in the 2018 NHL Entry Draft.

Personal life
Mandolese was born on August 22, 2000, in Ottawa, Ontario. He was raised in Ottawa until his family moved when he was six years old. While playing in the QMJHL, Mandolese attended Cape Breton University and majored in business.

Playing career
Growing up in Quebec, Mandolese played minor hockey for the Collège Esther-Blondin in the Québec midget AAA league before being drafted by the Cape Breton Screaming Eagles in the Quebec Major Junior Hockey League (QMJHL). He recorded his first career QMJHL win on October 9, 2016, in a 5–3 win over the Charlottetown Islanders. As a result of his play, he returned to the Screaming Eagles for the 2017–18 season.

During his sophomore season, Mandolese posted a goals-against average of 3.46 and a .884 save percentage.  He was also chosen to represent Team Canada internationally at both the Under 17 and Under 18 levels. As a result of his play, Mandolese was ranked 2nd amongst all North American Goaltenders eligible for the 2018 NHL Entry Draft. After being drafted by the Ottawa Senators in the 2018 NHL Entry Draft, Mandolese attended their Rookie Camp before returning to the QMJHL.
 
Mandolese returned to the Screaming Eagles for the 2019–20 season, his fourth and final season. He experienced a breakout season during the shortened campaign and became the third Screaming Eagles goaltender to play in his 150th regular-season game, behind Marc-André Fleury and Olivier Roy. Mandolese completed the major junior season leading league goaltenders in save percentage and ranking third in goals-against average. As a result, he was named to the QMJHL First Team All-Star and named a finalist for the CHL Goaltender of the Year Award. Mandolese and teammate Egor Sokolov subsequently became the first two Screaming Eagles players to both be named QMJHL First Team All-Stars. On April 13, 2020, Mandolese signed a three year entry-level contract with the Senators, who praised him for being positionally sound, good lateral mobility and adept at reading the play.

Once the league returned for the delayed 2020–21 season, Mandolese was assigned to the Senators' American Hockey League (AHL) affiliate, the Belleville Senators. After appearing in two games, Mandolese earned his first professional win in a 3–2 victory over the Toronto Marlies at Canadian Tire Centre.

Mandolese started his first NHL game on February 14, 2023, for the Senators facing the New York Islanders on Long Island. He stopped 46 of 48 shots on goal to secure the 3–2 victory in a shoot-out.

Career statistics

References

External links

2000 births
Living people
Allen Americans players
Atlanta Gladiators players
Belleville Senators players
Canadian ice hockey goaltenders
Canadian people of Italian descent
Cape Breton Screaming Eagles players
Ice hockey people from Ontario
Ottawa Senators draft picks
Ottawa Senators players